Africa is a 2009 Perpetuum Jazzile album. The most-well known piece from the album is an a capella version of Toto's "Africa". A YouTube video showing group's performance of this song was uploaded in May 2009 and has since been viewed close to 22 million times.

Track listing
 "Africa" (D. Paich/J. Porcaro/T. Kozlevčar) – 6:18
 "Kadar sem sama"
 "Earth Wind & Fire Medley"
 "Poletna noč" (M. Sepe/E. Budau/T. Kozlevčar) – 4:20
 "Aquarela do Brasil" (A. Barroso/A. Barroso/T. Kozlevčar) – 5:34
 "Prebujena"
 "Libertango" (Astor Piazzolla) – 3:09
 "Só danço samba"
 "Prisluhni školjki" (J. Golob/M. Jesih/T. Kozlevčar) – 4:15
 "Bee Gees Medley" – 8:42
 "No More Blues / Chega de saudade" (A.  C. Jobim/V. de Moraes/T. Kozlevčar) – 3:22
 "Will You Be There // Ecce quomodo moritur iustus"

References

2009 albums
Perpetuum Jazzile albums
Slovene-language albums
Portuguese-language albums